Dytynets Park (Chernihiv) is the most ancient area of Chernihiv is Dytynets. It is a hill on the bank of the Desna River, where a defense complex is situated. Walking along the alleys of the park, you can feel the spirit of ancient times, marvel at the panorama of the Boldyna Hora, see the numerous churches and cathedrals, and observe the whole city. At the viewing point, there are 12 cast-iron bastion cannons from the seventeenth century, which are the calling card of the city. By the way, Dytynets is a perfect spot to have a lunch in one of the traditional cuisine restaurants.

Across the street from Dytynets Park, you will find Catherine's Church from the beginning of the 18th century. This is one of the best examples of the Ukrainian Baroque style with onion-shaped golden domes.

Right in the center of the city, there is Piatnytska Church from the 12th/13th century. The style is a bit raw, with red bricks, but it's impressive nevertheless.

History 
The first fortifications were formed here in the VIII century on the site of a more ancient settlement. Chernihiv soon became one of the most significant cities, as evidenced by its mention under 907 in the "Tale of Bygone Years". In the agreement between Oleg and Byzantium, he is mentioned as the second most important after Kyiv.

Detinets occupied the entire southwestern section of the cape (about 11 hectares). It was surrounded by an earthen rampart with a wooden wall and a deep moat, had three entrances: Water, Kyiv and Burned Gates. In detinets housed the princely court, rich estates of the wealthy nobility and the main cathedrals of the city. The fact that the detinets were built up to a large extent by stone structures, in addition to the Cathedral of the Transfiguration of the Savior and the Cathedral of Borisoglebsky, which were preserved to this day, is also evidenced by the remains of the princely courtyard of the 10th century, consisting of two stone towers from two to three floors, and its episcopal courtyard of the 12th century with stone wall and gate church. Significant influence in the city enjoyed the clergy – until the end of the X century, pagan, and then Christian. The pagan temple was probably located on the territory of the detinets, where at the beginning of the XVIII century two silver idols were found. From the north and west, Okolny Grad adjoined the detinets – the most populated handicraft and trading part of Chernihiv, not inferior in area to the Kyiv city of Yaroslav. It was surrounded by powerful walls after the battle of Listvy, when Chernihiv became the center of a vast principality. At the foot of the detinets on the river side was an extensive Chernihiv hem, part of which (probably the area of the ancient pier) was fortified with a shaft with wooden structures. The edges of the Desna and Swifts' terraces were fairly densely built up.

In the XII century, the area of the Detinets expanded significantly, which amounted to 16 hectares. The original moat, which was located 70 m east of the Transfiguration Cathedral, was filled up and the Detinets expanded eastward. At the same time, the border of Okolnoy Grad expanded to the east, the area of which reached 40 hectares. On the west side, the Tretyak adjoined the detinets – an independent fortified section of the Okolny City with an area of 20 hectares. To the north and west of Okolny Castle there was a vast Pisgorodor fortified with a stockade, rampart, and moat.

In October 1239, the city was burned by the hordes of Khan Mengu. The fortifications of the children were updated by the Lithuanian prince Vitovt in the 14th century. The city suffered great damage from the Crimean Tatars in 1482 and 1497.

In 1500, Seversky land, along with Chernihiv, went to the Russian state. During the sixteenth century, the city repeatedly became the object of Lithuanian-Polish attacks, but all of them were repulsed. Since the old fortifications fell into disrepair, in 1531, by decree of Grand Duke Vasily III, the construction of a new wooden Kremlin kid's building with five high towers, a deep moat and an underground passage to the Strizhen River was completed by decree of the cape protruding to the side of the Desna. The armament in the fortress consisted of 27 guns, and its garrison numbered about 1000 people. Three years later, the fortress successfully withstood the Lithuanian siege. After a series of sieges during the Livonian war, the injured Chernigov detinets were again rebuilt and strengthened in 1584–1592. The street from Pogoreloy (North) has become the main one. Administrative houses, barracks and an artillery yard were erected along it.

Chernihiv suffered Polish ruin during the Time of Troubles in 1611, when units of the Kiev subcommittee Samuel Ermine tricked into the city and completely burned it.

After the uprising of the Khmelnytsky and Russian-Polish war of 1654–1667, the Chernihiv fortress became the administrative and political center of the Chernihiv regiment, while preserving the significance of the fortress at the same time. Here in the XVII century the house of Colonel Jacob Lizogub was built.

In the XVIII century Detinets built up with new buildings. The predominant element of the composition was the Chernihiv collegium with a bell tower. In 1799 the fortress was liquidated. According to the new building plan of Chernigov, at the beginning of the 19th century, the ramparts of the fortress were partially excavated. In their place, a boulevard is broken. After 1845, a park called Val was founded on the site of Detinets and the Chernihiv fortress. Two squares were created: Gymnasium and Cathedral.

Since 1964, the modern name of the park has been adopted – Central Park of Culture and Rest named after M. Kotsyubinsky, and the monuments on its territory became part of the National Chernihiv ancient architectural and historical reserve. One of the main attractions of the children is the cannons from the bastions of the Chernihiv fortress, donated by the legend to the city of Peter I. There are 12 guns in total.

Monuments
 Saviour-Transfiguration Cathedral is the first brick church in Chernihiv, and one of the first in Kievan Rus'.
 Church of Boris and Gleb – a brick church built during the reign of Prince David Svyatoslavovich of Chernihiv.
 Mazepa's house, or Lyzogub's house, later became the house of the Regiment Chancellery.
 Chernihiv's Collegium is the first higher education institution on the left bank of Ukraine.
 The building of the Chernihiv Men's Gymnasium was built in 1804, one of the first educational institutions in the city of Chernihiv.
 The building of the Chernihiv Women's Gymnasium is now the Chernihiv Regional Art Museum
 Cast iron bastion guns – 12 pieces, cast in the XVIII century.
 The Archbishop's House is the first building in the city built in the style of classicism. Now the regional state archive.
 Monument to Taras Shevchenko.
 Monument to Ivan Mazepa – the first monument to Ivan Mazepa erected in the Ukrainian city, in August 2009, by the sculptor Gennady Jerszow.
 The memorial stone "To the Fighters for the Freedom of Ukraine" was erected in October 1992.

Gallery

See also 
 List of parks and gardens in Chernihiv

References

External links 

Tourist attractions in Chernihiv
Parks and gardens in Chernihiv
Tourist attractions in Chernihiv Oblast
Buildings and structures in Chernihiv
Tourism in Chernihiv